The 1974 Colgate Red Raiders football team was an American football team that represented Colgate University as an independent during the 1974 NCAA Division I football season. In its seventh season under head coach Neil Wheelwright, the team compiled a 4–5 record. Robert Como and James Detmer were the team captains. 

The team played its home games at Andy Kerr Stadium in Hamilton, New York.

Schedule

Leading players 
Two trophies were awarded to the Red Raiders' most valuable players in 1974: 
 Jim Detmar, guard, received the Andy Kerr Trophy, awarded to the most valuable offensive player.
 Ken Jasie, defensive tackle, received the Hal W. Lahar Trophy, awarded to the most valuable defensive player.

Statistical leaders for the 1974 Red Raiders included: 
 Rushing: Pat Healy, 685 yards and 7 touchdowns on 121 attempts
 Passing: Bruce Basile, 910 yards, 57 completions and 7 touchdowns on 123 attempts
 Receiving: Dave Lake, 793 yards and 7 touchdowns on 39 receptions
 Total offense: Bruce Basile, 1,510 yards (910 passing, 600 rushing)
 Scoring: Pat Healy, 48 points from 8 touchdowns and 4 two-point conversions
 All-purpose yards: Pat Healy, 823 yards (685 rushing, 91 kickoff returning, 35 receiving, 21 punt returning)

References

Colgate
Colgate Raiders football seasons
Colgate Red Raiders football